Gylne ungdom (Golden Youth) is a Norwegian drama film from 1956. It was directed by Leif Sinding, who also wrote the screenplay.

Plot
The high school student Tom Polden does not have it easy at home. His mother lives in the memories of her husband, the lawyer Ernst Polden. Her hat shop is doing poorly, and her finances are meager. Tom constantly hears about his great father, and it therefore comes as a shock to him when one day he hears that his father shot himself because he had embezzled a substantial amount of money. At the same time, his mother is threatened with eviction from the apartment because she has not paid rent for several months. In his despondency, Tom break into a grocery store in desperation to obtain money. Then the web starts tightening around him. A cynical young boy gets Tom in his power, and against his will he is forced into theft, stealing from cottages, and brazen burglary. However, Tom's bright spot in life is Eva, a girl in his class that he is infatuated with. The film was seen as the Norwegian version of Rebel Without a Cause with James Dean.

Cast

 Odd Borg as Tom Polden
 Urda Arneberg as Eva
 Tom Tellefsen as Carl-Otto Harling
 Randi Brænne as Dagny Polden, Tom's mother
 Turid Haaland as Carl-Otto's mother
 Joachim Calmeyer as Lorang
 Tore Foss as Jørgen Sommervoll, a doctor
 Gretelill Fries as Constance, Sommervoll's wife
 Dan Fosse as Olaf Vestby, a shopowner
 Egil Hjorth-Jenssen as Christian Dahl, a farm owner
 Willie Hoel as Halvor Nesset, a farmer
 Ella Hval as a saleswoman
 Berit Kullander as a dancer
 Per Lillo-Stenberg as Per Callier

References

External links
 
 Gylne ungdom at the National Library of Norway
 Gylne ungdom at Filmfront
 Gylne ungdom at the Swedish Film Database

1956 films
Norwegian drama films
Norwegian black-and-white films
Films directed by Leif Sinding
1956 drama films